Farsun (also Romanized as Fārsūn; also known as Farsan) is a village in Armand Rural District, in the Central District of Lordegan County, Chaharmahal and Bakhtiari Province, Iran. At the 2006 census, its population was 583, in 105 families.

References 

Populated places in Lordegan County